The 1965 season in Swedish football, starting April 1965 and ending November 1965:

Honours

Official titles

Notes

References 
Online

       
Seasons in Swedish football